The men's 110 metres hurdles event at the 2002 Commonwealth Games was held on 29–30 July.

Medalists

Results

Heats
Qualification: First 2 of each heat (Q) and the next 2 fastest (q) qualified for the final.

Wind:Heat 1: –0.2 m/s, Heat 2: +0.1 m/s, Heat 3: +0.7 m/s

Final
Wind: +0.4 m/s

References
Official results
Results at BBC

Hurdles
2002